Sékou Gassama (born 6 May 1995) is a Senegalese footballer who plays as a forward for Spanish club Racing de Santander, on loan from Real Valladolid.

Club career
Born in Granollers, Barcelona, Spain, Gassama started his career at FC Barcelona's youth setup, as a central defender. He finished his formation with UD Almería, and made his senior debut with the reserves on 13 October 2013, coming on as a half-time substitute in a 0–3 Segunda División B home loss against La Roda CF.

On 14 July 2014, Gassama signed a three-year contract with Real Valladolid, being assigned to the B-team also in the third division. The following 26 January he terminated his contract and joined another reserve team, Rayo Vallecano B in the same category.

Gassama continued to appear in the third and fourth tiers in the following years, representing Bergantiños CF, CF Badalona, UE Sant Andreu and Almería B. With the latter he achieved promotion to the third division by netting a career-best 21 goals, six only in the play-offs.

Gassama was definitely promoted to Almería's main squad in Segunda División ahead of the 2018–19 campaign, and made his professional debut on 17 August, starting in a 0–1 away loss against Cádiz CF. His first professional goal came on 11 September, as he scored the equalizer in a 2–1 away defeat of Málaga CF for the season's Copa del Rey.

On 1 November 2018, Gassama scored a late brace in a 3–3 home draw against Villarreal CF also for the national cup. The following 31 January, he moved to third division side Valencia CF Mestalla on loan until June.

Gassama returned to the Rojiblancos for the 2019–20 season, being a first-choice under Pedro Emanuel and scoring a brace in his first match of the campaign, a 3–0 home defeat of Albacete Balompié. However, he lost space after the arrival of Darwin Núñez and Juan Muñoz, being demoted to a backup option by new manager Guti.

On 28 January 2020, Gassama signed a four-and-a-half-year contract with La Liga side Real Valladolid, being immediately loaned to CF Fuenlabrada until June. On 1 October, he was again loaned to Fuenla for the 2020–21 campaign, but spent the most of the season nursing foot and knee injuries.

On 28 August 2021, Gassama moved to fellow second division side Málaga CF on loan for the 2021–22 season. Roughly one year later, he moved to Racing de Santander in the same category, also on a one-year loan deal.

Personal life
Gassama's siblings Mamadou and Kaba are handball players.

References

External links

1995 births
Living people
Footballers from Granollers
Spanish people of Senegalese descent
Spanish sportspeople of African descent
Spanish footballers
Senegalese footballers
Association football defenders
Segunda División players
Segunda División B players
Tercera División players
CF Damm players
UD Almería B players
Real Valladolid Promesas players
Rayo Vallecano B players
CF Badalona players
UE Sant Andreu footballers
UD Almería players
Valencia CF Mestalla footballers
Real Valladolid players
CF Fuenlabrada footballers
Málaga CF players
Racing de Santander players
Senegal youth international footballers